Universal Truths and Cycles is the 13th studio album by American indie rock band Guided by Voices. After releasing their previous two albums on TVT Records, Guided by Voices returned to Matador Records.

This was the highest charting Guided by Voices album at the time of release. It peaked at #160 on the Billboard Top 200, #10 on the Independent Albums list, and in the best chart performance of their career, #3 on the Top Heatseekers chart [].

Track listing
All songs written by Robert Pollard.

Side A
 "Wire Greyhounds" – 0:35
 "Skin Parade" – 2:57
 "Zap" – 1:14
 "Christian Animation Torch Carriers" – 3:54
 "Cheyenne" – 2:58
 "The Weeping Bogeyman" – 1:35
 "Back to the Lake" – 2:33
 "Love 1" – 0:54
 "Storm Vibrations" – 4:59
 "Factory of Raw Essentials" – 1:25

Side B
 "Everywhere with Helicopter" – 2:36
 "Pretty Bombs" – 3:06
 "Eureka Signs" – 3:06
 "Wings of Thorn" – 2:10
 "Car Language" – 4:44
 "From a Voice Plantation" – 2:06
 "The Ids Are Alright" – 1:10
 "Universal Truths and Cycles" – 2:19
 "Father Sgt. Christmas Card" – 2:04

In the media
 In the television series The IT Crowd episode Red Door, Roy hides stolen computer equipment under a Universal Truths and Cycles T-shirt. There is a poster of the same on a wall in Roy and Maurice's office.
 In the television series The Wire Nick Sobotka has a Universal Truths and Cycles poster on his wall.
 Guided by Voices performed "Everywhere With Helicopter" live on The Late Late Show with Craig Kilborn on June 17, 2002.

Personnel 
Most of the credits do not give specific instruments played by each individual, but rather list performers who appeared on the release in any capacity.

Guided by Voices 

 Robert Pollard 
 Doug Gillard
 Tim Tobias 
 Nate Farley

Additional musicians 

Scott Bennett – cello
 John McCann – drums
 Chris Slusarenko – piano (track 7)
 Chris George – cello
 Steve Berson – cello
 Suellen Ogier – effects
 Asha Mevlana – viola, strings
 Helen Yee – violin

Technical 
 Todd Tobias – production
 Scott Bennett – assistant engineer

References 

2002 albums
Guided by Voices albums
Matador Records albums